The Confederate Soldier Memorial, also known as Confederate Monument and Memorial Arch, is an outdoor Confederate memorial installed at Camp Chase in the Hilltop neighborhood of Columbus, Ohio, in the United States.

Description and history

The monument was erected in 1902 and commemorates the 2,260 Confederate soldiers buried at the site. Its original wooden arch, which was inscribed with the word "AMERICANS", was replaced with the current stone arch in 1902.

The statue on top was toppled and destroyed by vandals overnight on August 22, 2017, and was repaired and re-installed in May 2019.

See also

 1902 in art
 List of Confederate monuments and memorials

References

External links
 

1902 establishments in Ohio
1902 sculptures
Bronze sculptures in Ohio
Granite sculptures in Ohio
Confederate States of America monuments and memorials
Monuments and memorials in Ohio
Outdoor sculptures in Columbus, Ohio
Sculptures of men in Ohio
Statues in Columbus, Ohio
Vandalized works of art in Ohio